Netvigator is a residential Internet service provider in Hong Kong, operated as a brand of Hong Kong Telecom, a subsidiary of PCCW. The company did offer iTV, an interactive movie television network that allowed users to watch movies on their TV screen by demand. The service ended in 2002 (PCCW later re-entered multichannel television market with IPTV service Now TV in 2003).

History

Netvigator dial-up Internet Access Service was first launched under Hong Kong Telecom IMS Limited under the directorship of Dr. William Lo on 18 April 1996. It acquired another ISP, hkstar, with all the infrastructure and clients. Their broadband service, under the brand name "Super Netvigator" was launched as a value-added service of the InteractiveTV (iTV) in May 1998.  Subsequently, it launched their standalone broadband service (directly connected to PC without iTV), under the service name "Netvigator 1.5M Ultraline", in July 1999.

United Kingdom operation

Trading initially under the Netvigator brand, with the company name UK Broadband, PCCW entered the UK broadband market with wireless broadband in mid-2004, starting with the Thames Valley.  The brand migrated to Now Broadband during 2005, and the London market was opened for business.  At the same time the support call centre for the UK was moved from Hong Kong to an outsourcer in the north of England.

In September 2007, Now Broadband sent out letters to selected areas in the UK cancelling the service, citing "limitations not apparent when we launched the service in your area" as the reason for closing certain radio sites.

References

External links
 
UK Broadband (ex-Netvigator) corporate details

Internet service providers of Hong Kong
Former internet service providers of the United Kingdom
Companies established in 1996
Pacific Century Group